Plaça de Catalunya station, also known as Barcelona-Plaça Catalunya, Plaça Catalunya or simply Catalunya is a major station complex in Barcelona located under Plaça de Catalunya, the city's central square and a large transport hub. Many Rodalies de Catalunya, Barcelona Metro and Ferrocarrils de la Generalitat de Catalunya lines go through it and many bus routes link it with all of the districts of the city and most of the municipalities in its metropolitan area.

It is one of the oldest railway stations in Catalonia and one of the first stations of Barcelona Metro network. It is also one of the busiest stations in Barcelona and the terminal station in the city of all Metro del Vallès lines. It is served by Rodalies de Catalunya suburban lines R1, R3, R4 and regional line R12, TMB-operated Barcelona Metro lines L1 and L3, FGC-operated Barcelona Metro lines L6 and L7, and Metro del Vallès lines S1, S2, S5 and S55.

History

Ferrocarril de Sarrià
The current location of Plaça de Catalunya was the place chosen to build in 1863 the Ferrocarril de Sarrià terminus station. At this moment, the current square didn't exist and the city rampart had been recently destroyed. Ferrocarril de Sarrià a Barcelona, popularly known as tren de sarrià, created a line from this station to Gràcia, Sant Gervasi and Sarrià neighbourhoods, which were separated municipalities from Barcelona. Between 1924 and 1929 it was built a temporary terminus station on Balmes street, between Ronda Universitat and Gran Via while the new underground station was being constructed. In 1929 was opened the new Ferrocarril de Sarrià terminus station which was underground and it was located under Pelai and Bergara streets. Originally, the station had two tracks and one "nave" with platforms 1 and 2. In 1959 a second nave was opened, with platforms 3 and 4, and some years later, a third nave with platforms 5 and 6.

The arriving of the Iberian gauge
In 1854, the Vilafranca line placed its terminus station near Canaletes and Portal de Isabel II, on the south part of Plaça de Catalunya. This line was built in Iberian broad gauge and connected Vilafranca del Penedès and other municipalities in Tarragona province with Barcelona city. Finally, this line placed its terminus station at Sants railway station. On 1 July 1932 a new underground station serving the Iberian gauge rail was opened as a terminus station on Manresa and Puigcerdà lines. These lines had its terminus station at Estació del Nord and were managed by Ferrocarril del Norte, one of the Renfe's predecessors. In 1977 with the opening of the rail link between this station and Sants, the station ceased to be a terminus station and Manresa and Puigcerdà lines placed its terminus station in Sants. The facilities were completely rejuvenated in 1983 as the station had heavily deteriorated.

Gran Metropolitano de Barcelona
Barcelona Metro line 3 station was opened on 30 December 1924 with the opening of the line between this station and Lesseps. This part of the line was the first metropolitan railway and the starting of Barcelona Metro network, which was managed by Gran Metro and was called Gran Metropolitano de Barcelona. Initially, the station was not linked to the Transversal station when this one was opened. After the municipalization of the company during the 1960s, the platforms were extended to hold a fifth car and a corridor to link both metro lines was built. During the 1980s the former corridor that linked the station with Rodalies was closed, but today is still preserved although it is not used. In 2007 the access from Rivadeneyra street was closed because a transformer was installed in to provide more electrical power to the line. Some years before, one of the accesses located on the south part of the square was closed due to vandalism.

Ferrocarril Metropolitano Transversal
Barcelona Metro line 1 station is one of the first metro stations in the city of Barcelona and it was part of Ferrocarril Metropolitano Transversal. Although this station was opened on 14 June 1926 its current location was opened in 1933. At first it was a terminus metro station and it was located  under Ronda de la Universitat, between Rambla de Catalunya and Balmes street, and it had two tracks and three platforms. From 1 July 1932, it shares the station with Ferrocarril del Norte and the platform composition changed to one center platform for the Iberian gauge rail and two side platforms for the metro situated at each side of the Iberian gauge tracks. With the RENFE station reforms in 1983, Barcelona Metro line 1 station was reformed too.

Station Layout

Gallery

References

External links
 
 Rodalies de Catalunya
 Ferrocarrils de la Generalitat de Catalunya
 Transports Metropolitans de Barcelona
 Information about L1 metro station
 Information about L3 metro station
 Trens de Catalunya - Trenscat.com
 Information and photos about Rodalies station
 Information and photos about FGC station
 Information and photos about L1 metro station
 Information and photos about L3 metro station

Railway stations in Spain opened in 1933
Stations on the Barcelona–Vallès Line
Barcelona Metro line 1 stations
Barcelona Metro line 3 stations
Barcelona Metro line 6 stations
Barcelona Metro line 7 stations
Railway stations in Spain opened in 1924
Railway stations in Spain opened in 1929
Transport in Ciutat Vella
Transport in Eixample
Railway stations located underground in Spain